Fiesta is an Australian television series which aired in 1958 on ABC Television. Described as a "Latin-American dance and song programme", it was produced in Sydney, and kinescoped ("telerecorded") for broadcast in Melbourne.

The series featured the Gino Hernandez Sextet, as well as singer Ron Fabri. Episodes were 30-minutes in duration, in black-and-white. It is not known if any of the episodes still exist, given the varied survival rates of early ABC programming.

See also
Cafe Continental - 1958 ABC variety series

References

External links

Australian live television series
Black-and-white Australian television shows
English-language television shows
Australian variety television shows
Australian Broadcasting Corporation original programming
1958 Australian television series debuts
1958 Australian television series endings